(literally, in front of the ball-park) is a passenger railway station located in the city of Aki, Kōchi Prefecture, Japan. It is operated by the third-sector Tosa Kuroshio Railway with the station number "GN28".

Lines
All Asa Line trains, both rapid and local, stop at the station.

Layout
The station consists of a side platform serving a single track on an embankment. There is no station building and the station is unstaffed but a waiting room which comprises both open and enclosed compartments has been set up on the platform. Access to the platform is by means of a flight of steps. A timber waiting room in traditional Japanese architectural style has been set up at the base of the embankment together with a bike shed and parking lots for cars.

Adjacent stations

Station mascot
Each station on the Asa Line features a cartoon mascot character designed by Takashi Yanase, a local cartoonist from Kōchi Prefecture. The mascot for Kyūjōmae Station is a figure with a baseball for a head dressed in yellow baseball gear with vertical black stripes named . The baseball theme relates to the baseball stadium near to the station.

History

Passenger statistics
In fiscal 2011, the station was used by an average of 222 passengers daily.

Surrounding area
Japan National Route 55
 Aki Municipal Stadium
 Aki Multipurpose Gymnasium

See also 
List of railway stations in Japan

References

External links

Railway stations in Kōchi Prefecture
Railway stations in Japan opened in 2002
Aki, Kōchi